John Hope Bryant (born February 6, 1966) is an American financial literacy entrepreneur and businessman. Bryant is the founder, chairman and chief executive officer of nonprofit Operation HOPE, chief executive officer of Bryant Group Ventures and The Promise Homes Company, co-founder of Global Dignity, advisor to business and government and author of bestselling books on economics and leadership.   He served as vice-chair of President Bush's Council on Financial Literacy, a member of President Obama's Advisory Council on Financial Capability, the vice chair on the U.S. President's Advisory Council on Financial Literacy and as the chairman of the Committee on the Underserved.

Early life

Bryant was born on February 6, 1966, in Los Angeles, California, and raised primarily in Compton, and in the South Central area of Los Angeles, by parents Juanita Smith and Johnnie Will Smith.

Bryant started his first business at age 10, a neighborhood candy store. At age 15 he enrolled in the private K-12 Hollywood Professional School and made connections which led to a career acting on television.

Career
On May 5, 1992, Bryant founded Operation HOPE, Inc. immediately following the 1992 Rodney King riots in Los Angeles, California.

Spearheaded by Bryant, the first Bankers Bus tour occurred while parts of the city were still on fire. Bryant has organized and led over 15 bankers bus tours since HOPE's inception in 1992, including the cities of Los Angeles, Maywood and Oakland, California, Anacostia, D.C. and Atlanta, Georgia, with the purpose of encouraging financial investment in low-to-mod communities.
 
On January 22, 2008, Bryant was appointed vice-chairman of the President's Council on Financial Literacy by U.S. President George W. Bush. He continued this work under President Barack Obama as part of the U.S. President's Advisory Council on Financial Capability (PACFC). He was appointed chairman of the new Subcommittee on the Underserved and Community Empowerment for the PACFC in January 2012.

Bryant directly inspired the creation of the City of Los Angeles loan fund (Administration of Mayor Tom Bradley), financial literacy as U.S. federal government policy, circa 2008, (George W. Bush Administration), U.S. Small Business Administration Office of Entrepreneurship Education  (George W.  Bush Administration), emergency financial disaster preparedness, response and recovery federal policy framework for the U.S. Department of Homeland Security/FEMA (George W. Bush Administration), commitments for 100+ local financial literacy councils across the U.S., and formalized the inclusion of FEMA into federal financial capability policy (a seat on the U.S. Financial Literacy & Education Commission for the Obama Administration).

Motorsports
In November 2014, Bryant started a pursuit in motorsports. His first track day was a 2 Day event with Chin Track Days at Road Atlanta in a modified 2010 Lotus Evora. Bryant quote "fell in love with the track and the car" and further described high performance driving as "Buddhism at 150mph."

In February 2016, Bryant attended the Skip Barber Racing School at Road Atlanta and received his Full Competition Racing Certification.

In April 2016, Mark Lauth, CEO of Fantastic Racing, invited Bryant to join his FR-Shelby Racing Team for the 11th Annual Phakisa 2-Hour Endurance Race in South Africa driving a Shelby Can Am prototype race car. He took 3rd place overall with a total of 60 laps completed.

In October 2016, Bryant unveiled his newly acquired Shelby Mustang GT350R at the Caffeine and Octane car show in Atlanta alongside a new project called Bryant Group Motorsports Academy which he describes as: "a new nonprofit organization that will be focused on inspiring, exposing and empowering young people with what we call their 'Identity Project.' Once a young person from an underserved community figures out what their 'Identity Project' is, there is not much in life that can stop them.....We believe that motorsports, which is connected to financial literacy and STEM (and physics), can open the door to untold, untapped opportunity, and could inspire a re-imagination of self for a generation of young people."

In February 2018, Bryant was invited to participate in an event with an amateur racing series, called American Endurance Racing (AER), at Road Atlanta, driving a spec E46 M3 BMW. During Bryant's session, as he was approaching the turn 7 complex, Bryant passed another driver on the inside as a corner worker displayed a waving yellow flag indicating there was an issue on track. Unfortunately, Bryant did not see this first flag and continued at race pace and missed an additional 25 flags/two laps of full course yellow, as well as passing a stationary emergency vehicle and safety workers on foot while he was traveling at greater than 95 mph. According to Bryant's testimony on the YouTube channel VINwiki, he was focused on driving and missed the flags unintentionally. After receiving a black flag and getting off track, AER elected to remove Bryant, and the rest of the team, from the race that day. After the release of Bryant's video on VINwiki, AER and Bryant both released statements in response to the incident taking full responsibility for his mistake and further explaining the situation, respectively.

Appointments
On June 13, 2004, U.S. President George W. Bush appointed Bryant to a four-year term on the non-partisan U.S. Community Development Advisory Board for the Community Development Financial Institutions Fund (CDFI Fund), at the U.S. Department of the Treasury.

In September 2008, he was selected to be a member of the Global Agenda Council for the World Economic Forum, Geneva, Switzerland.

On January 29, 2010, he became a part of President Barack Obama's Advisory Council on Financial Capability.

Honors and awards 
 1994: selected by Time magazine as "One of America's 50 Most Promising Leaders of the Future," as part of their 50 for the Future cover story.
 1998, the first African-American to be knighted by German nobility and the royal House of Lippe.
 2004 he received an honorary Doctorate Degree of Humane Letters from Paul Quinn College in Dallas, Texas, for his work around education and poverty eradication.
 2005, received the Crystal Heart Award from the University of Southern California School of Social Work for his work in community service.
2010, Latvian President Valdis Zatlers received Bryant on behalf of the Republic of Latvia as the second speaker for the Latvia Presidential Speaker Series at Latvia University, on the topic of "The Economic Reset, Love Leadership in a fear-based world, and financial literacy as a new civil right."
 2010, Newsmax magazine named him for his work at Operation HOPE, as one of their 2010 Heroes.
2011, The Root named him to its 2011 100 List of Influencers and Iconoclasts.
2011, Operation HOPE and Bryant received the Marcus Garvey Bridge Builder in the Diaspora Award during the 16th Annual Caribbean Multi-National Business Conference in Jamaica.
2012, Leaders and Legends Award from the California Black Chamber of Commerce at their annual conference in Sacramento, California.
2012, Working Group Advisor to CGI America for the Clinton Global Initiative and former U.S. President Bill Clinton
 Bryant is the namesake of the "John Bryant Scholarship in Urban Social Development", a permanent scholarship fund at the University of Southern California School of Social Work.
 Named 2016 Innovator of the Year by American Banker magazine
 Inc. "The World's 10 Top CEO's" in 2016 (honorable mention)
Atlanta Business Chronicle "The Power 100: Most Influential Atlantans in 2020"
Northside Neighbor "Bryant Talks Success, Mentorship at Buckhead Group Meeting"
 Member of Phi Beta Sigma Fraternity, Inc

Bibliography 
The Memo: Five Rules for Your Economic Liberation, Bryant, John Hope Berrett-Koehler Publishers, 2017, 
How the Poor Can Save Capitalism Bryant, John Hope Berrett-Koehler Publishers, 2014, 
Love Leadership:The New Way To Lead In A Fear-Based World Bryant, John Hope Jossey-Bass, 2009, 
Actions Speak Loudest: Keeping Our Promise For A Better World  McKinnon, Robert, Williams, Juan The Lyon Press, 2009, 
Banking on our Future: a Program for Teaching You and your Kids about Money by Bryant, Beacon Press, 2002, 
 Silver Rights Movement Book Series
 Dignity in the Middle East
 Fixing the Jericho Road: The Silver Rights Movement and the Good Samaritan 
 Silver Rights Movement in Africa
 The Wealthless Power 
 The Ownership Society
 Racism and the Silver Rights Movement
 Banking on Our Future: The Promise for America's Unbanked 
 The Silver Rights Movement
 Leave No Community Behind

Further reading
"The New Color of Success: Twenty Young Black Millionaires Tell You How They're Making It", by Niki Butler Mitchell, Prima Lifestyles (December 15, 1999), 
Face Forward: Young African American Men in a Critical Age, by Julian C.R. Okwu, Chronicle Books (March 1, 1997),

References

External links
Leave No Community Behind, by John Bryant, (2001)

Living people
1966 births
People from Compton, California
Paul Quinn College alumni
Philanthropists from California